The MZ-2500, also known as the Super MZ, is an 8-bit personal computer released on 1 October 1985 as part of the Sharp MZ series. It is a successor to the MZ-2000/2200 and a direct successor to the MZ-80B From the previous generation. The MZ-2000 was a model that was given significant functions along with faster processing speed. It is also the final model of the entire 8-bit MZ series with its own architecture. It is sometimes referred to as the best 8-bit machines along with the 6809 FM77AV and the MB-S1. In the Japanese computer magazines, it was also called the phoenix (Phoenix). It’s successor was the Sharp MZ-2861 which has a compatible mode and a newly developed 16-bit mode. The development code is LEY and can be found in the circuit diagram etc.

Overview 
Clean Design

As with the standard MZ model, the main unit does not have the system program on onboard ROM. However, while the old model included only the IPL, a program for controlling advanced hardware is included as an IOCS, and a number of repairs have been made. One of the functions is one that can call a specific location, so an incompatible element is specified for an application that addresses the module in the ROM and calls it directly without calling the function as a reference.

2 types of BASIC attached

The instruction set BASIC-S25, which the typical MZ user was familiar with, and the BASIC-M25, which has a Microsoft- type instruction set that was already at the forefront of the BASIC environment at that time, were prepared. It is not a conventional model, and Hu-BASIC adopted in the company's departmental series, but has become another implementation of BASIC.

CPU clock improvement

The MZ-2500 is equipped with the Z80A and operates at 4 MHz, but the MZ-2500 is equipped with the Z80B, and except for some, it has 6 MHz operation with one wait during M1 cycle.

Memory management enhancements

While the old model only allowed you to assign a specific address to another space by bank switching in order to open a window with text and graphics VRAM, the MZ-2500 is equipped with a memory controller like the MB-S1 etc. It was designed to be able to allocate an arbitrary space in units of 8 KB for a memory space divided into eight.
This has made it possible to manage 256 KB of main memory and 128 KB of graphics VRAM, and by enabling free allocation, the software can be mapped by mapping video memory in the same arrangement as other models. The porting of the design address space is 512 KB. Various ROMs and RAMs are arranged in this space.

Equipped with Argo Key

Due to the above-mentioned increase in the degree of freedom of memory mapping and capacity, a function called an algo function has been added to BASIC.
A key with the mark of the Argo, which is a symbol of the series, is prepared and assigned a function to call the built-in application.
In addition, the Argo ship which is the original mark is correct "Argo", but the spelling in the utility is the notation of "Algo" which came from " Algorithm ". Close to the resident program, apart from the loaded program, it was possible to start a calculator or the like by key operation as a standard.

Significant enhancement of CRTC

In the standard model, the display peripheral which was a specification that the CPU directly writes to VRAM mapped to the memory space for each plane without having one ALU has been greatly strengthened in the same machine.
The number of colors corresponds to an output of 256 colors in the 320x200 mode and 16 colors in the maximum 640x400 mode. Although not specified as a specification, it is also possible to output at a resolution of 320x400 by installing an additional video memory from the design specification of a custom chip.
In addition, simultaneous writing is supported for multiple planes, which enables high-speed drawing even for colors across planes.
The palette board has evidence added later in design, and is designed to output specified values in 4096 colors as a palette by interrupting the circuit using a high-speed memory when outputting 16 colors. Also, from the implementation, the existence can not be determined from the software side.
In addition to them, having a PCG has made it possible to reduce the definition of external characters as well as the background composition processing in games.
In addition to the above display functions, the text screen is vertically smooth scroll. The graphics screen supports vertical and horizontal smooth scrolling.
However, since the 256 color mode is not a packed pixel but an array of stacked planes, the display is not suitable for moving anything.
Even in this era, the speed of access to the graphic VRAM itself is not fast because there is no mechanism such as cycle steel.
In addition, the execution of the program on the graphic VRAM is not guaranteed, and at the time of read modify write, 2 Wait is included.

Loading of kanji text VRAM

Like Sharp's PC-9800 series and X1turbo, it is equipped with Kanji text VRAM. It is possible to display the font up to the second JIS standard only by writing the display code. Processing is much lighter than transferring a font image as a graphic from a kanji ROM, and even though it is an 8-bit machine, it has achieved a more comfortable handling of Japanese than models of the same price range.

Data recorder installation

Similar to conventional models, a software-controllable data recorder is attached. The head itself was in stereo, and one channel was available as a data recorder and the other as an audio track. During the late 1980s to early 1990s, the Japanese home computer market shifted to floppy-based software supply, and the tape drive was used only to the extent that some software required a device to play back recorded audio. It was also possible to use it as an answering machine as well as for voice recording. The tape recorder was installed for compatibility with the old model, and was removed in the MZ-2520, which is an inexpensive version in which does not have the MZ-80B / 2000 mode.

Communication-aware design

The MZ-2500 included a serial port and dedicated modem phone socket for "personal computer communication" i.e. to connect to data services online such as BBSes. Terminal software was also included as standard. The combination of the dedicated devices made it possible to use the built-in data recorder also as an answering machine.

Hardware 

 With significant additional functions, support for older models is provided by the mode switch.
 In MZ-2000 / 2200, there was a part incompatible with MZ-80B, but in MZ-2500, it became possible to use all the assets of the old model of the series by preparing MZ-80B mode.
 In addition, there is a mode to operate 80 B mode and 2000 mode at 6 MHz as a hidden function, but the reproduction of sound to which CPU speed directly acts and the handling of data recorder are incompatible.
 The MZ-80B has a green display, but in the 80B mode, the screen is drawn in black and white.
 The same peripheral devices as the previous model can continue to be used, but the 16-bit board can not be used because of the difference in physical shape and design.
 The 3.5-inch FDD has a large vertical width. The operation noise is also relatively large.
 The appearance is configured as a keyboard connected with curled cord to the main body of rectangular parallelepiped, and except for MZ-2520, a kangaroo pocket is prepared on the front panel, a resolution switch at startup, and a switch for MZ-2000 / 80B mode, There are slide volume for volume, IPL and RESET button.
 The joystick is compatible with the ATARI specification, and the mouse is MZ-5500 or X series.
 Since the control of FDD follows the implementation of the old model, since it is necessary to prohibit the interrupt and transfer by software, processing such as accessing without stopping BGM can not be performed.

Four types of models had been released.

The following two models were released as initial models.

 MZ-2511 A model with one built-in FDD. Standard price 168,000 yen.
 MZ-2521 A model with two built-in FDDs. Standard price 198,000 yen.

After that, a minor change was made under the name of Super MZ V2 as a model change.

 MZ-2531 A model that added an optional dictionary ROM and additional main memory to the MZ-2521 and added a TV control. Standard price 199,800 yen.
Furthermore, the following models have been released as low-cost versions. The design of the successor MZ-2861 followed that of this model.

 MZ-2520 MZ-2521 specification, remove the data recorder, the compatibility mode of the old model. Standard price 159,800 yen.

Specification

 CPU: Z80B 6 MHz / 4 MHz
 RAM:
 With the main 128 KB standard option, 256 KB can be expanded.
 GVRAM: 64 KB included. Up to 128 KB can be added.
 CGRAM: 14 KB Text-VRAM and PCG (Programmable Character Generator) installed.
 ROM:
 IPL / IOCS 32KB
 TELENET 16 KB voice communication interface (MZ-1E26) attached (option)
 Kanji font ROM 256KB-JIS first level, second level
 Dictionary ROM 256 KB (option)-Built-in dictionary for kana-kanji conversion similar to that of the dedicated word processor .
 When the pallet board is installed (option) 16 colors can be displayed in 4096 colors.
 Sound source: YAMAHA YM2203 One built-in. (FM sound source 3ch + SSG sound source 3ch, 8 octaves each + noise 1Ch)
Although BEEP also exists, the combination is difficult because it needs to be directly controlled by Z80. In addition, voice can be uttered by optional voice board.
 FDD
 The MZ-2520 / 2521/2531 has two 3.5-inch 2DDs
 Only one MZ-2511 is built in.
 Voice recorder
 Button operation and software control possible-Electromagnetic mechanism
 2-track independent head Analog recording and playback possible
 Data transfer method: Sharp PWM method Data transfer speed: 2000 bits / second
 Power supply: AC100V 50 / 60 Hz power consumption 50W
 Operating environment: Temperature 10 °C-35 °C, humidity 20%-80% (non-condensing)
 External dimensions
 Body: Width 350 × depth 345 × height 128 (mm)
 Keyboard: Width 410 × depth 196 × height 38 (mm)
 Weight
 Body: Model 20 (MZ-2511) 7.9 kg
 Body: Model 30 (MZ-2521) 8.6 kg
 Keyboard: 1.4 kg
 Display ability
 text
80 lines x 25 lines / 20 lines / 12 lines color 8 colors
40 lines x 25 lines / 20 lines / 12 lines Maximum color (64 colors)
 Graphic VRAM 128 KB time
640 × 400 (4 colors) 1 screen
640 × 200 (16 colors) 1 screen
320 × 200 (16 colors) 2 screens
320 × 200 (256 colors) 1 screen
 Graphic VRAM 256 KB time
640 × 400 (16 colors) 1 screen
640 × 200 (16 colors) 2 screens
320 × 200 (16 colors) 4 screens
In addition to 320 x 200 (256 colors) 2 screens, it is out of specification
320 × 400 (256 colors) 1 screen

Installed interface 
 Printer: Centronics standard SHARP specification 25-pin D-Sub connector x 1 port.
 Serial port: RS-232C compliant 25-pin D-Sub x 1 port (A), 9-pin D-Sub x 1 port (B).
 External FDD terminal SHARP specification 37-pin D-Sub x 1 port.
 Joystick: ATARI 9-pin D-Sub x 2 port.
 Keyboard: Proprietary specification 8-pin mini DIN connector x 2 ports (exclusive connection of the lower right part of the front panel and the front right side).
 Mouse: SHARP specification 5-pin mini DIN connector x 2 ports (exclusive connection of the lower right part of the front panel and the front right side).
 Display output terminal CRT : Color (analog / digital switching) 8-pin DIN connector x 1 port, monochrome (analog / digital switching) 5 pin DIN connector x 1 port.
 Display TV control terminal: SHARP standard 8-pin DIN x 1 port.
 Expansion slot x 2 (optional).
 Internal connector for voice board.
 Voice connector: External connector for dedicated modem phone. 8 pin mini DIN x 1 port.
 Audio connector: Audio input / output stereo mini jack (monaural)

Other 
 Common to MZ-2500
 The keyboard has been changed from the conventional arrangement so that the cursor keys are arranged from the horizontal row in the direction of the arrow. The position is located on the ten keys where the keys are densely packed, but it is taller than other keys and can be identified.
 MZ-2511 / 2521/2531
 Kangaroo pocket volumes and buttons are prone to contact failure due to aging.
 MZ-2531 (Super MZ V2)
 The MZ-2521 (early model) incorporates an additional VRAM, a dictionary ROM, and a television control circuit.
 The television control circuitry is located at the location of the dictionary ROM, and the board layout has been slightly modified.
 As for the appearance, three lines were drawn at the position of the FDD on the front panel, and the color of the eject button was darkened, and the printing described as MZ-2500 on the top plate disappeared.
 Bundled software BASIC has become V2.
 The company's X1tuboZ can display 4096 colors as standard, but 16 of 4096 colors can be used even with the optional color palette board.
 MZ-2520
 The specifications are equivalent to the MZ-2521 (early model), but the difference in appearance is that the front kangaroo pocket has disappeared, the button attached to the panel has been changed, and the FDD has become thinner. In addition, MZ-2000 / 80B mode, data recorder, one RS-232C port, connector of expansion FDD is deleted, and circuit of replacement of drive No. with built-in FDD etc. is deleted with deletion of terminal of FDD. The As a result, some incompatible software may not start. In addition, pallet board became non-compliant.
 The keyboard connector, MZ-2861 and MZ-25x1 have different shapes, and although the signals are the same, they can not be physically exchanged.
 By activating the IPL while pressing a specific key, you can make detailed specifications.
 Official (owner's manual, MZ-2511 / 2521 included)
/ Key: Loads and executes a program from the ROM located in the I / O space.
E key: Replace the built-in FDD with (FD3, FD4) and the external FDD with (FD1, FD2).
R key: RS-232C baud rate (in 2000 and 80 B mode, it can be specified from 19200 bit/s to 150 bit/s. 9600 bit/s automatically if not pressed).
C key: Forced activation from cassette deck (even in MZ-2500 mode).
1 key: Force activation from FD1.
2 key: Forced activation from FD2.
3 key: Force boot from FD3.
4 key: Force boot from FD4.
 Informal (information at the time of MZ-2511 / 2521 release) [3] and later models have some of the functionality removed.
 B key: Perform test (RAM-check) on main RAM and graphic RAM (46 blocks). The judgment result (No / Good) is displayed for each block.
 G key: Do not clear graphic RAM (do not fill in black). Due to the hardware structure, there is no guarantee that all pixels are completely held.
 X key: MZ-80B mode (Mode switch is at MZ-2500 position).
 Z key: MZ-2000 mode (Mode switch is at MZ-2500 position).

Software 
During its development and before its release Sharp made a software creation request to videogames developers. However unlike typical video game system releases there were no major software releases available at launch for the MZ-2500 at the time. Although the MZ-2500's high portability by memory mapping design encouraged porting from other models, there were few products that made use of its unique functions and performance. The MZ series had the habit of building for a heavy user base for many years, many of which were homebrew software programs because no commercial software was readily available for the platform. Although there were many commercial software programs available on other system platforms, and despite the MZ-2500 had gained a large share in the market, it did not change the situation for the MZ-2500 series, and commercial software releases for the system eventually fell. In addition, Nintendo released their own software for the platform, and Namco (later Bandai Namco Games) ported several software programs from Radio News (microcomputer software).

Attached Software
 BASIC M25 / S25
BASIC-M25 (MZ-6Z002) is an instruction-type interpreter according to Microsoft -like BASIC, and BASIC-S25 (MZ-6Z003) is BASIC which cherishes the flow of Sharp genuine BASIC derived from PET. These BASICs were included in the same system floppy and could be selected by starting while pressing the HELP key .
Converters were also prepared for programs created only in BASIC, and even with the new BASIC, it was possible to convert programs of the previous model incompletely. If the internal codes of BASIC S 25 and M 25 are equivalent to each other, the same instruction is assigned to the intermediate code. Although not as special as X-BASIC, it is possible to use labels including Kanji, as well as line numbers, in addition to input in abbreviations derived from Hu-BASIC.
Indents are compressed and managed in intermediate code, and nesting, conditional branching, etc. can be described over multiple lines, etc. For BASIC, a highly readable, flexible, and more conscious of structural ability. It was possible to write. The Algo function can be set at boot time, and since it was not genuinely registered tools etc., there weren't many published software, but Oh! MZ showed some examples. Depending on the screen mode, smooth scrolling is used in processes involving scrolling, such as directory display and program list display, so that the contents can be easily tracked without stopping the screen. Although there are various factors such as the degree of optimization of the comparison object, in the benchmark in BASIC, it can be said that the interpreter's own speed was high as at that time, such as thinning to PC-9800 series using 8086 of 8 MHz.
 Telephone software (MZ-6Z010)
Simple communication software. The serial port terminal was attached as standard considering the use of PC communication.

System software
 P- CP / M (MZ-6Z001)
A portable version of Personal CP / M, which is rare in Japan.
 MSX-DOS
DOS to run Multiplan. It is not sold alone but can read and write MS-DOS format files, but it is a subset of the MSX OS of the same name.
 S-OS "SWORD"
The common system of Z80 published in Oh! MZ magazine. On many Z80 models, the same binary ran the same application for the same system.
The MZ-2500 supports kanji conversion, kanji output, high-resolution display font, etc. in addition to the standard specifications, and an algo function is also available.
Since 2DD disks can not support the entire area according to specifications, they are effectively used by allocating 512 KB to the file system and writing the main part of the system to the remaining part.
Other than the MZ-2520, the MZ-80B / 2000/2200 version can also be used.
 FENIX
An OS designed and implemented at the end of the year. There are not so many users as the application is only development tools.
Designed specifically for the same model, it is possible to call the IOCS, and it is basically possible to start up a standalone binary.
Management is performed in memory block units, and if EMM is implemented, it can be swapped to it, and by using it together, it can manage an area of up to 1 MiB in appearance.
The command shell has been adopted for the UNIX-like flow.

Game software
 Xevious
Development, porting by Radio News Agency.
By corresponding to the palette board and smooth scroll, the metallic expression by the color scheme using the gradation unique to the game and the smooth scroll of the background are realized.
As described above, since the gradation by the palette board supports a large amount, in the 8-color and 16-color modes, there is no big difference between the other models and the still screen, and it can not be said that it is a beautiful screen.
Although there is no sprite function, the processing of background composition is reduced, so the airborne objects also show relatively smooth movement, and Ande Genesis also moves independently from the background.
Although there are some transcription errors in BGM, the data compression is also on memory, and the data of the main game and SuperXEVIOUS which is the high difficulty version of the game are also prepared.
Until the release of the X68000 version, it was considered to be the most faithful version by PC porting standards.
 Pacman
Development and port by Radio News Agency.
The start, the title part is described by BASIC, the game itself is described by an assembler, the character's algorithm, the coffee break, etc. are changed to be all you like.
The charge for the port is the same as MZ-2000 / 2200 version.
 Moon child
Role playing game by HOT-B.
Although the game did not come up as a game, the MZ-2500 version uses the audio track of the data recorder and the head extension function to play back narration and audio at the title and event.
The program is used with BASIC and is the only commercially available software that uses a data recorder.
Since the ending staff roll relies on BASIC, it scrolls smoothly while stopping line by line due to the display amount and speed. In addition, the BGM output is produced at a small volume relative to the average volume of software using other FM sound sources, in balance with the reproduction volume of the data recorder.
 Laydock
A port of a game developed for MSX2 with T & E software.
Since there is no sprite function, the movement unit of the character is 3 dot units and is drawn in the 320 × 200 dot 16 color mode. Because there is no palette board for the port to which the software is ported and the original model is capable of multi-color display, it will be a slightly obscured screen including the title screen.
In the MZ-2520, a non-compliant seal was affixed to the product due to a change in the hardware implementation of the FDD.
 Daemon Crystal
A ported version of the series for MZ-1500, which has been released by Radio News Agency.
Few software that works in 256 color mode.
 SPACEBLASTER SG
Published in Oh! MZ magazine. A port of the MZ-700 game to "Argo function".
Since the attributes can not be specified separately by characters and background, the same screen is configured by the PCG definition. There is a difference in color development.

Coterie 
There were also free porting of commercial software by volunteers and activities such as disk magazines.

 Hoshibako
A coterie based disc magazine. ☆ The notation of DUST BOX was also used.
Starting from BASIC, you can run documents and programs from your own shell, the documents are decorated by coloring, blinking, etc., and an editor for editing is also provided.
In addition to programs and data submitted by readers, many works by the proponent himself were also posted.
In response to the EMM board from the middle issue, when connection was detected at startup, the contents of the floppy were transferred in advance and the diskless operation was performed.
By the extension of MML, the BGM performance program which assumed the interruption of the sound effect, the implementation of the pseudo sprite, etc. were also performed.
Due to the busyness of the author, the issue was irregular, and the distribution was made by sending raw disks or sending fixed-price small exchange.
In the second half, 3D racing games and two-player fighting games with large characters were also announced using text VRAM and tiling patterns.
The leader is still active as a game programmer at AM2 lab of SEGA.

Peripheral Equipment 
Mainly, genuine products are described below. The joystick port is Atari's specifications, and the mouse has an interface compatible with X1 and X68000, so hardware with these specifications can also be used. The serial port is also RS-232C compliant, so a general serial connection modem can be used.

 MZ-1F07
Genuine 5.25 inches FDD. Expansion is possible by connecting to the back interface.
It is also possible to prioritize and recognize the expansion side for compatibility with the old model.
 MZ-1D22 (dedicated analog display)
The dimensions were matched to the width of the main body, so it could be mounted on the main body.
 MZ-1D24 (Dedicated analog display TV)
A dedicated display TV corresponding to the TV control added in MZ-2531.
The vertical width is made to line up when the body is placed vertically with the stand.
A dedicated display TV corresponding to the TV control added in MZ-2531.
 MZ-1D26 (Dedicated analog display TV)
Analog connection monitor dedicated to the MZ-2500 series with the television reception function omitted
 MZ-1E26 (voice communication board)
A board that made it possible to use an answering machine instead by using a modem phone etc.
 MZ-1E32 (Parallel port for MZ-1V01 connection)
 MZ-1E35 (ADPCM board)
A board equipped with Y8950 ( MSX-AUDIO ) that enables ADPCM recording and playback.
Although it is hardware for MZ-2861, since it is an interface board on the 8 bit side, it can also be used with MZ-2500.
 MZ-1E30 (HDD I / F)
 MZ-1F23 (20 MB HDD)
 MZ-1R24 (Dictionary ROM board)
It incorporates a dictionary derived from Shoin, and enables continuous phrase conversion in the main unit.
 MZ-1R37 (640 KB EMM board)
A 640 KB memory board mapped to I / O space.
 MZ-1U09 (expansion slot)
Two-slot expansion slot. In fact, it was a metal frame, a slot installed in it, and a flat cable, and compatible products were also sold from Ibit Electronics.
 MZ-1M08 (voice board)
This is a voice synthesis board released as an option for the MZ-1500, but it is also available on this unit.
34 types of fixed messages Fixed messages, pronunciation for each note, and a few melodies are recorded as ROM and are generated by playing them.
The fixed messages are pronounced in monotones, so although the connection between sounds is unnatural, it can be heard more clearly than formant synthesis speech synthesis. Refer to the section of MZ-1500 for details.
Although English pronunciation is built into the chip, only Japanese voice connected outside the chip is supported by BASIC.
 MZ-1M10 (4096 color pallet board)
Internally added analog pallet board.
 MZ-1X29 (Genuine mouse)
 MZ-1X30 (modem phone)
Dedicated modem phone. A device that integrates a 300 b.ps modem and a telephone. By using the MZ-1E26 in combination, the main unit could also be used as an answering machine.
 XE-1AJ / CZ-8NJ2
Atari company digital / analog joystick.
The former is that the button by the radio newspaper company (microcomputer software) is orange.
With the design intact, the button was black and Sharp sold it as a genuine X68000 product, and the latter was called Cyberstick.
There is no correspondence in the commercial software, but the driver is posted on the waste bin and can be input even in the analog mode.
 XE-1AP
Space-saving compatible products of the above Cyber Stick.
It has a connection mode of the mega drive etc. It was also called a horseshoe crab because of its shape.
 MZ-2500 with Hitachi HD64180. Board with MIDI interface for the MZ-2500, produced on the same base, provided improved sound.
It has a 10 MHz version of HD64180, 512 KB of RAM, and 2 KB of shared RAM, and the main unit writes data to the shared memory and uses it.
The hardware itself does not depend on the MZ-2500, and there is no ROM such as firmware, so if you have a control program, you can use it with an MZ with a slot of the same specification.
Because it has a faster CPU and a wider memory space than the main unit side, it is possible to calculate faster than the main unit if it is a process without I / O.

Footnote 
^ If you want to perform advanced settings, specify the RS-232C baud rate, start drive, internal and external FDD replacement, and start from a special board by activating the IPL while pressing a specific key
^ Compatible mode operates at 4 MHz, but pressing the IPL button while pressing the Z or X key activates the mode of each old model at 6 MHz.
^ Super MZ utilization research 260 pages of BASIC-M25 hidden instruction

References 

MZ-2500 Technical Manual (Engineering)
Materials of IOCS, materials such as all circuit diagrams. MZ-2200 was a standard attachment, but was published in the form of a book.
BASIC-M25 source list Super MZ (engineering company)
BASIC-M25 source code.
Super MZ utilization research (radio newspaper)
An I / O map was published along with the hardware description.

External links 
 Games for MZ-800, Download Sharp MZ-800
 The Sharp Users Club
 A dedicated resource for all Sharp MZ machines
 MZ-80A Comprehensive Guide
 Sharp MZ-800 emulator
 Sharp MZ-2500 brochure and system photos

MZ
Personal computers
Z80-based home computers
Computer-related introductions in 1985